Joseph Patrick Clancy (born October 28, 1990) is a former American football quarterback and current Quarterback Coach at Merrimack College. He played college football at Merrimack College.

Early life
A three-sport letterman at Newburyport High School in Newburyport, Massachusetts, Clancy played football, basketball and baseball for the Clippers. He was named a Boston Globe All-Scholastic in both football and baseball his senior year.

College career
Clancy continued his football career at Merrimack College in North Andover, Massachusetts. Clancy redshirted his freshman year for the Warriors.

2010 Season
Appeared in seven games passing for 466 yards and three touchdowns.

2011 Season
Played in all 10 games, completing 53 of 83 passes for 781 yards and seven touchdowns.

2012 Season
After splitting time at Quarterback the previous season, Clancy entered 2012 as the sole starter and emerged as one of the best players in the country. He was named Northeast-10 Conference Offensive Player Of The Year, earned All-Region distinction and won the Harry Agganis Award for Senior Achievement. He led the NE-10 with 323 completions for 3,945 yards and 31 touchdowns in 10 games. The Warrior offense was near the top in several statistical catorgories nationally and averaged 525.8 yards a game which was 2nd overall. Clancy's 3,945 passing yards was ranked 4th in the country. Clancy tied the league record for passing touchdowns in a game with (7) against St. Anselm on October 20, completing 27 of 42 passes for 553 yards.

2013 Season
Clancy followed up his stellar 2012 campaign with an even more impressive 2013 season, leading Merrimack to a 7-4 record. The offense once again ranked near the top nationally in several catorgories. Clancy shattered numerous school and conference records en route to one of the most prolific seasons in conference history. He became the first NE-10 quarterback to throw for over 4,000 yards in a season finishing with 4,116 while also breaking single-season conference records for completions (396), attempts (615) and touchdowns passes (48).

Clancy opened the season throwing 22 touchdowns in Merrimack's first four games including four against Division 1A Wagner. He set a school record for single-game passing yards with 571 yards against American International and tied his conference record of seven touchdown passes vs. Pace. He finished the season ranked 3rd nationally in yards passing and 2nd in touchdown passes and ended his career at Merrimack with every major single-game, season, and career passing record. In just two seasons as the full-time starter, he is the conference all-time leader in completions (812) and completion percentage (63.7%) and his 89 career TD passes and 9,308 passing yards rank him 3rd respectively.

Following the season Clancy was again named NE-10 Offensive Player of the Year. Other honors followed including First Team All-Conference, Beyond Sports Network Honorable Mention All-American, Gridiron Club of Greater Boston Co-Offensive Player Of The Year, New England Football Writers All-New England, Daktronics All-Super Region I Second Team and was named a regional finalist for the Harlon Hill Trophy, the Division II equivalent of the Heisman Trophy.

Clancy was selected to a number of bowl games following the 2013 season. He first played in the 2013 National Bowl at Florida International University in Miami, Florida. He was then selected and played in the 2014 Medal of Honor Bowl at the Citadel in Charleston, South Carolina where he led all quarterbacks with 88 yards passing.

Professional career

Örebro Black Knights
Clancy joined the Black Knights, in the Swedish Superserien, mid season after a season-ending injury to the successor at the position. Joe took the Black Knights to second place in the Swedish final game held at Tele2 Arena in Stockholm. He threw 10 touchdowns to 7 different receivers in his first game with the Black Knights.

Blacktips
In the fall of 2014, Clancy signed with the Blacktips of the Fall Experimental Football League (FXFL). He made his first start on October 25, 2014, against the Boston Brawlers. Clancy finished out the season with the Blacktips.

San Jose SaberCats
Clancy was assigned to the San Jose SaberCats of the Arena Football League (AFL) on February 5, 2015. He was placed on recallable reassignment on March 23, 2015.

Los Angeles KISS
On April 28, 2015, Clancy signed with the Los Angeles KISS. Clancy appeared in his first game with the KISS during their Week 6 game at the Las Vegas Outlaws. Clancy was 5-for-19 passing for 62 yards. On March 26, 2016, Clancy was placed on recallable reassignment.

Coaching career
In 2017, Clancy was hired as the Quarterback Coach at his alma mater, Merrimack College.

References

External links
Merrimack Warriors bio 
Arena Football bio

Living people
1990 births
American football quarterbacks
Merrimack Warriors football players
Blacktips (FXFL) players
San Jose SaberCats players
Los Angeles Kiss players
Players of American football from Massachusetts